Éthier (or ‘’’Ethier’’’) is a surname, and may refer to: 
Joseph Arthur Calixte Éthier (1868–1936), Quebec, Canada, politician
Viateur Éthier (1915–1976), Ontario businessman and politician
Denis Éthier (1926–2017), Quebec, Canada, politician
Michèle Lamquin-Éthier (born 1946), Quebec, Canada, politician
Andre Ethier (born 1982), baseball player 
Andre Ethier (musician), (fl. 2010s)
 Kathleen Ethier (fl. 2020), American communicable-disease administrator